Burachek, Burachyok is a surname. Notable people with the surname include:

 Mykola Burachek (1871–1942), Ukrainian impressionist painter and pedagogue
 Yevgeny Burachyok (1836–1911), Russian seaman and the second head of Vladivostok garrison

Ukrainian-language surnames